Shenstone railway station is a railway station on Station Road, in the village of Shenstone, in Staffordshire, England. It is situated on the Cross-City Line between Redditch and Lichfield via Birmingham.

History
Shenstone station was opened in 1884, when the London and North Western Railway extended their Birmingham to Sutton Coldfield line northwards to Lichfield.

Services
There are trains every 30 minutes in each direction every day, served by West Midlands Trains with local Transport for West Midlands branded "Cross-City" services, operated by Class 323 electrical multiple units with an average journey time to Lichfield City of around 5 minutes and Birmingham New Street of around 32 minutes.
On Mondays to Saturdays, two trains per operate southbound; to Bromsgrove via Longbridge. Northbound there are also two trains per hour, to Lichfield Trent Valley. On Sundays, trains run every 30 minutes between Lichfield Trent Valley and Redditch.

References

External links

Rail Around Birmingham and the West Midlands: Shenstone station

Lichfield District
Railway stations in Staffordshire
DfT Category E stations
Former London and North Western Railway stations
Railway stations in Great Britain opened in 1884
Railway stations served by West Midlands Trains